CDI, CDi, CD-i, or .cdi may refer to:

Businesses and organizations

Government and political organizations
Center for Defense Information, a Washington, D.C. think tank founded in 1972
Center for Digital Inclusion, originally "Comitê para Democratização da Informática", a non-governmental organization in Brazil 
Centrist Democrat International, formerly the Christian Democrat International, a political international formed in 1961
China Development Institute, a Shenzhen, China think tank founded in 1989
Comisión Nacional para el Desarrollo de los Pueblos Indígenas, Mexico's National Commission for the Development of Indigenous Peoples
California Department of Insurance, The State of California insurance regulation department

Schools and colleges
CDI College, a for-profit college in Canada
Collège des Ingénieurs, educational institution in France, Germany and Italy
Control Data Institute, an international technical vocational school created by the American Control Data Corporation

Other businesses
Camperdown Dairy International, an Australian infant formula company
CDI Corporation, an engineering services and employment agency in Philadelphia, PA
Cellular Dynamics International, an American research support company
Churchill Downs Incorporated, parent company of Churchill Downs
Controlled Demolition, Inc., a Phoenix, Maryland firm that specializes in controlled demolition
Chungdahm Institute, a company in Korea that specializes in teaching English

Economics
Category Development Index, measures the sales strength of a particular category of product, within a specific market 
Contrat à durée indéterminée, French for open-ended contract, the usual form of employment contract in France
Child Development Index, a measure of global child poverty
CREST Depositary Interest, in investing, a form of depositary receipt in the UK

Science and technology

In chemistry, biology and medicine
Carbonyldiimidazole, an activating agent used for example for peptide coupling
Central diabetes insipidus, an endocrine disorder
Clinical documentation improvement, a process of improving healthcare records
Clostridioides difficile infection, an intestinal disease also known as Clostridium difficile infection
Combined drug intoxication, also known as Multiple Drug Intake (MDI)
Contact-dependent growth inhibition, a type of toxin delivery between bacteria which requires direct contact
Cyclin-dependent kinase inhibitor protein, a protein which inhibits cyclin-dependent kinase

Computing
Contexts and Dependency Injection, a Java standard for the inversion of control design pattern
CD-i, a CD-derived multimedia format, including its players made by Philips

Imaging techniques
Coherent diffraction imaging, a lensless nanoscale imaging technique
Current density imaging, an extension of magnetic resonance imaging (MRI)
Color doppler imaging, a type of Doppler ultrasonography

In transportation
Capacitor discharge ignition or thyristor ignition, a type of electronic ignition system
Common rail diesel injection, a modern method of fuel injection in diesel engines
Course deviation indicator, an aircraft navigation instrument

Other uses in science and technology
Capacitive deionization, a water desalination technology based on the use of electrical field effects
Common direct injection, a synonym of common rail; a type of fuel injection
Customer data integration, a discipline concerned with representation of data in enterprise systems
Cyrel Digital Imager, a direct laser-engraving flexography plate printing device
.cdi filename extension, for DiscJuggler disk images, developed by Padus
„”, the lift-induced drag coefficient

Other uses
Cote d'Ivoire, a country in West Africa once known as Ivory Coast
Chief of Defence Intelligence, head of the UK Defence Intelligence Staff
Ciudad de las Ideas (conference), a conference at Puebla, Mexico
Custodial Detention Index, a list of U.S. residents compiled by FBI during 1939–1941, later used for Japanese-American internment
Chak De! India, a 2007 Bollywood sports film about field hockey in India
401 in Roman numerals
Certified Deaf Interpreter, a certificate offered by the Registry of Interpreters for the Deaf